William Norwich is a writer and author. He is a former editor at Vogue and the former New York Post society gossip columnist. He is the editor for fashion and interior design at Phaidon Press.

His novel My Mrs. Brown was inspired by the 1958 Paul Gallico novel Mrs. 'Arris Goes to Paris.

Books
My Mrs. Brown (Simon & Schuster, 2016)
Learning to Drive (Atlantic Monthly Press, 1996)
Molly and the Magic Dress (Doubleday, 2001)

References

External links
William Norwich at Vogue

Living people
Year of birth missing (living people)
Place of birth missing (living people)
Nationality missing
20th-century male writers
21st-century male writers
20th-century American novelists
21st-century American novelists
American magazine editors